Roy Lee Lassiter (born March 9, 1969) is an American former professional soccer player who played as a forward. He played the first few years of his professional career in Costa Rica. He returned to the United States to play in Major League Soccer when that league was launched in 1996, and from 1996 to 1999 he was one of the most prolific goal scorers in MLS.

He is the father of Ariel Lassiter, who plays for Inter Miami CF of MLS.

Early life and education
Lassiter was born in Washington, D.C., but grew up in Raleigh, North Carolina where he attended Athens Drive High School. He was the North Carolina State 4-A Player of the Year as a senior and a high school All-American. That year, he led his high school soccer team to the state championship while scoring a state record 47 goals. He also played for a local youth club, 69 Raleigh Rockets, which beat to the LaJolla Nomads 3–0, Roy scored all three goals, in the 1986 Noitis National Club Championship Cup. Lost in the 1986 Southern Regional Finals, in Plano TX, to the Dallas Titans 3–2, before the McGuire Cup. Lassiter attended Lees-McRae College in 1987, won the D3 National Championship 1988. He then transferred to North Carolina State University in 1989, where he was a 1991 First Team All-ACC and All South.

Club career
While convalescing, Lassiter was contacted by Turrialba from Costa Rica in 1992. As Lassiter recalls it, "I have no idea how they got my name. They paid for my trip down there while still recovering from my leg injury, and I signed a contract." He also played for Carmelita and in summer 1995, Alajuelense sold him to Major League Soccer. In August 1995, Lassiter was arrested in connection with two burglaries that took place in 1992 after a Raleigh police detective read a newspaper article that mentioned a goal Lassiter scored in a U.S. friendly match with Benfica. Lassiter was sentenced to 30 days in jail.

In 1996, Lassiter won the top goalscorer award in Major League Soccer, scoring 27 goals for Tampa Bay Mutiny, after when he was loaned for 6 months to Italian Serie B side Genoa. His record in the league's inaugural season was tied several times, but stood until it was broken in 2018 by Josef Martínez of Atlanta United FC. 

Lassiter was traded to D.C. United in 1998 for Roy Wegerle. He played two seasons in DC, winning the MLS Cup in 1999. Lassiter was traded to the Miami Fusion in 2000 due to salary cap, as Lassiter sought a significant pay raise yet D.C. United were near their salary cap limit. He was then traded to the Kansas City Wizards in 2001, and back to DC in the middle of the 2002 season. He ended his MLS career with 88 regular season goals, a record surpassed in 2004 by Jason Kreis. Lassiter added 13 goals in MLS playoffs and is 3rd in that category behind Carlos Ruiz and Landon Donovan. 

He ended his professional career with A-League's Virginia Beach Mariners in 2003 as player/assistant coach, but played a few games with Laredo Heat of the Premier Development League and the exhibition Austin Posse in 2004 to help promote their clubs.

International career
Lassiter was called up to the U.S. national team in January 1992. He earned his first cap as a substitute for Eric Wynalda in a 1–0 loss to the Commonwealth of Independent States in Miami. However, he broke his leg in a training ground collision with Bruce Murray a few days later. His second cap with the national team came over three years later as a substitute for Frank Klopas in an August 16, 1995 1–0 loss to Sweden in Norrköping. On October 8, 1995, he played a third time for the national team, again as a substitute, scoring the game-winning goal in a 4–3 victory over Saudi Arabia. Lassiter's career continued to rise, and he earned his first start for the national team in December 1996 and became a regular for much of 1997. While Lassiter played consistently for the U.S. in 1997, his appearances tapered off in 1998 and he was selected as an alternate for the 1998 FIFA World Cup roster. He played only one game in 2000, his last with the national team. He represented his country in four FIFA World Cup qualification matches and finished his international career with 34 caps and 4 goals.

Career statistics
Scores and results list the United States' goal tally first, score column indicates score after each Lassiter goal.

Honors
Alajuelense
 Costa Rican Championship: 1995–96

Tampa Bay Mutiny
 MLS Supporters' Shield: 1996

D.C. United
 MLS Cup: 1999; runner-up 1998
 MLS Supporters' Shield: 1999
 CONCACAF Champions League: 1998
 Copa Interamericana: 1998

Individual
 MLS Golden Boot: 1996 (with Tampa Bay Mutiny)
 MLS Best XI: 1996 (with Tampa Bay Mutiny)
 CONCACAF Champions League MVP: 1998 (with D.C. United)

References

External links
 
 Photo of Lassiter at D.C. United
 
 Soccertimes profile of Roy Lassiter

1969 births
Living people
American soccer players
American expatriate soccer players
United States men's international soccer players
African-American soccer players
NC State Wolfpack men's soccer players
A.D. Carmelita footballers
L.D. Alajuelense footballers
Tampa Bay Mutiny players
D.C. United players
Genoa C.F.C. players
Miami Fusion players
Laredo Heat players
Sporting Kansas City players
Serie B players
Liga FPD players
A-League (1995–2004) players
Athens Drive High School alumni
Virginia Beach Mariners players
American expatriate sportspeople in Italy
American expatriate sportspeople in Costa Rica
Expatriate footballers in Italy
Expatriate footballers in Costa Rica
Soccer players from North Carolina
Soccer players from Raleigh, North Carolina
USL League Two players
Lees–McRae College alumni
Major League Soccer players
Major League Soccer All-Stars
1996 CONCACAF Gold Cup players
1998 CONCACAF Gold Cup players
Association football forwards